General elections were held for the first time in the newly formed Union of Tanzania in September 1965. The country had also just become a one-party state, with the Tanganyika African National Union as the sole legal party on the mainland, and the Afro-Shirazi Party was the only party in Zanzibar. For the National Assembly election there were two candidates from the same party in each constituency, whilst the presidential election was effectively a referendum on TANU leader Julius Nyerere's candidacy.

Voter turnout was 71.8% in the National Assembly election and 82.7% in the presidential election, although only 32.5% of the country's 9.8 million residents were registered.

In addition to the elected MPs, there were a further 94 unelected members; the 32 members of the Zanzibar Revolutionary Council, 20 members nominated from Zanzibar, 17 regional commissioners, 15 members chosen by the National Assembly, and up to 10 members nominated by the president.

Results

President

National Assembly

References

Presidential elections in Tanzania
Tanzania
1965 in Tanzania
Elections in Tanzania
One-party elections